Ostia Antica (Ancient Ostia) is a large archaeological site, close to the modern town of Ostia, that is the location of the harbour city of ancient Rome, 25 kilometres (15 miles) southwest of Rome. The name Ostia (the plural of ostium) derives from Latin os 'mouth'. The site is noted for the excellent preservation of its ancient buildings, magnificent frescoes and impressive mosaics.

History

Origins

Ostia may have been Rome's first colonia. According to legend, Ancus Marcius, the fourth king of Rome, was the first to destroy Ficana, an ancient town that was only  from Rome and had a small harbour on the Tiber, and then proceeded with establishing the new colony  further west and closer to the sea coast. An inscription seems to confirm the establishment of the old castrum of Ostia in the 7th century BC. The oldest archaeological remains so far discovered date back to only the 4th century BC. The most ancient buildings currently visible are from the 3rd century BC, notably the Castrum (military camp); of a slightly later date is the Capitolium (temple of Jupiter, Juno and Minerva). The opus quadratum of the walls of the original castrum at Ostia provide important evidence for the building techniques that were employed in Roman urbanisation during the period of the Middle Republic.

Civil wars

Ostia was a scene of fighting during the period of civil wars in the 80s BC. In 87 BC, Marius attacked the city in order to cut off the flow of trade to Rome. Forces led by Cinna, Carbo and Sertorius crossed the Tiber at three points before capturing the city and plundering it. After his victory here, Marius moved on to attack and capture Antium, Aricia and Lanuvium to further destroy the foodstores of Rome.

Sacking by pirates

In 68 BC, the town was sacked by pirates. During the sack, the port was set on fire, the consular war fleet was destroyed, and two prominent senators were kidnapped. This attack caused such panic in Rome that Pompey the Great arranged for the tribune Aulus Gabinius to rise in the Roman Forum and propose a law, the lex Gabinia, to allow Pompey to raise an army and destroy the pirates. Within a year, the pirates had been defeated.

The town was then re-built, and provided with protective walls by the statesman and orator Marcus Tullius Cicero.

Imperial Ostia

During Julius Caesar's time as dictator, one of his improvements to the city was his establishment of better supervision of the supply of grain to Rome. He proposed better access to grain by the use of a new harbour in Ostia along with a canal from Tarracina.

The town was further developed during the first century AD under the influence of Tiberius, who ordered the building of the town's first Forum.  The town was also soon enriched by the construction of a new harbour on the northern mouths of the Tiber (which reaches the sea with a larger mouth in Ostia, Fiumara Grande, and a narrower one near to the current Fiumicino International Airport).  The new harbor, not surprisingly called Portus, from the Latin for "harbour", was excavated by order of the Emperor Claudius. This harbour became silted up, and needed to be supplemented later by a harbour built by Trajan finished in the year 113 AD; it has a hexagonal form, in order to reduce the erosive forces of the waves. Moreover, at a relatively short distance, there was also the harbour of Civitavecchia (Centum Cellae). These elements took business away from Ostia itself and began its commercial decline. 

In 2008, British archaeologists discovered the remains of the widest canal ever built by the Romans, 300 feet wide, which they believe ran from Portus across the Isola Sacra to the Tiber opposite Ostia, which would have made the transport of large quantities of goods far easier than by land transport. In 2014, ruins were discovered on the north side of the river opposite the city, indicating a large built-up area with a massive structure. Within its walls, Ostia covered an area of 69 hectares, or 173 acres. During the 4th century, the city spilled over the southern walls to the sea south of Regioni III and IV on the map.  

Ostia itself was provided with all the services a town of the time could require; in particular, a famous lighthouse. The popularity of the cult of Mithras is evident in the discovery of eighteen Mithraea. Archaeologists have also discovered the public latrinae, organised for collective use as a series of seats that allow us to imagine today that their function was also a social one. Ostia had a large theatre, many public baths (such as the Thermae Gavii Maximi, or Baths at Ostia), numerous taverns and inns and a firefighting service. Ostia also contained the Ostia Synagogue, the earliest synagogue yet identified in Europe. Its excavation in 1960–61 changed the historical narrative for many academics.

Surroundings

South of Ostia there were many rich villa-estates along the coast road to Laurentum. Pliny described the route towards his villa there: “There are two different roads to it: if you go by that of Laurentum, you must turn off at the fourteenth mile-stone; if by that of Ostia, at the eleventh. Both of them are sandy in places, which makes it a little heavier and longer by carriage, but short and easy on horseback. The landscape affords plenty of variety, the view in some places being closed in by woods, in others extending over broad meadows, where numerous flocks of sheep and herds of cattle, which the severity of the winter has driven from the mountains, fatten in the spring warmth, and on the rich pasturage”.

Today several well-preserved Roman villas south of Ostia have been excavated in the area of Castel Fusano, including the Villa della Palombara excavated in 1989-2008.

Late-Roman and sub-Roman Ostia

Ostia grew to 50,000 inhabitants in the 2nd century, reaching a peak of some 100,000 inhabitants in the 2nd and 3rd centuries AD.
It became an episcopal see as part of the Diocese of Rome as early as the 3rd century AD; the cathedral (titulus) of Santa Aurea being located on the burial site of St Monica, mother of Augustine; she died here in 387 in a house property of the Diocesi of Rome.

In time mercantile activities became focused on Portus instead. For scholars of the High Empire Ostia was the seaside version of Rome, the city of apartment buildings. It used to be thought that the city entered a period of slow decline after Constantine the Great made Portus a municipality, Ostia thereby ceasing to be an active port and instead becoming a popular country retreat for rich aristocrats from Rome. In spite of the fact that Portus shows substantial growth in the 4th century, the traditional view that Ostia went into marked decline has had to be revised due to recent excavations and re-evaluation of the evidence. The knocking down of some apartment blocks replaced by houses of the rich was "thought to have signalled the disappearance of Ostia's once-vibrant group of non-elite residents and labourers"..."recent research has suggested we take a more nuanced view of residential patterns and social demography in the Late Antique city". Earlier views of decay relied on fleeting references in the ancient sources and excavators ignoring evidence from the period that the town continued to thrive despite pockets of decay into the 6th century, "..life in Ostia ended not with a Vesuvian bang but with a whimper" after a slow decline from the 6th to the 9th centuries. 

The city housed the headquarters of the Prefect of the Annona and his large staff. Although there are signs of decay in certain quarters, evidence indicates continued prosperity through 5th century, including: repairs on baths (26 remained in operation during the 4th century), public buildings, church construction, street repaving, residential and business expansion beyond the perimeter of the south wall (the presence of a small harbour, the Porta Marina on the sea, is attested), a huge 4th century villa located east of the Maritime baths, and the continued operation of the river port on the western edge of the town, the navalia, a squarish basin built in from the river, a warehouse on the east side and, behind it, a large bath complex, erroneously called the "palazzo imperial". Numerous bathing establishments are recorded as still operating in the 4th and into the 5th centuries with major repairs of the center-city Neptune Baths in the 370s. 

The city was mentioned by St Augustine when he passed there in the late 4th century. On their way back to Africa after Augustine's conversion to Christianity, Augustine's mother, Saint Monica, died in 387 in Ostia, while at a house property of the Diocesi of Rome 

The poet Rutilius Namatianus reported the lack of maintenance of the city ports in 414 AD. This view has been challenged by Boin, who states Namatianus' verse is a literary construct and not consistent with the archaeological record, ibid. pp. 22, 25, (the poet was lamenting the lost greatness of Rome after the sack of 410 and was hoping for the rise again of the great city).

After the fall of the Western Roman Empire in 476 (traditional date: Julius Nepos died 480 was the last legitimate emperor), Ostia fell slowly into decay as the population of Rome, 700–800,000 in AD 400 contracted to 200,000 or less in 500 AD. The city was finally abandoned in the 9th century due to the repeated invasions and sackings by Arab pirates. A naval battle, the Battle of Ostia, was fought there in 849 between Christians and Saracens; the remaining inhabitants moved to Gregoriopolis a short distance away.

Sacking and excavation

A "local sacking" was carried out by Baroque architects, who used the remains as a sort of marble storehouse for the palazzi they were building in Rome.

The Papacy started organizing its own investigations with Pope Pius VII. 

Under Benito Mussolini massive excavations were undertaken from 1939 to 1942 during which several remains, particularly from  the Republican Period, were brought to light. These were interrupted when Italy became a major battlefield of World War II.  

In the post-war period, the first volume of the official series Scavi di Ostia appeared in 1954; it was devoted to a topography of the town by Italo Gismondi and after a hiatus the research still continues today. Though untouched areas adjacent to the original excavations were left undisturbed awaiting a more precise dating of Roman pottery types, the "Baths of the Swimmer", named for the mosaic figure in the apodyterium, were meticulously excavated, in 1966–70 and 1974–75, in part as a training ground for young archaeologists and in part to establish a laboratory of well-understood finds as a teaching aid. 

It has been estimated that two-thirds of the ancient town are as yet unexcavated. In 2014, a geophysical survey using magnetometry, among other techniques, revealed the existence of a boundary wall on the north side of the Tiber enclosing an unexcavated area of the city containing three massive warehouses.

Modern day

The excavated site of Ostia Antica is open to the public as a tourist attraction. A number of finds from the excavation are housed on-site in the Museo Ostiense. The site has dining, and other facilities. The Theatre is also occasionally used for cultural events.

Media 

Ostia was featured in the novels I, Claudius and Claudius the God, both written by British novelist Robert Graves. The novels include scenes set at Ostia spanning from the reign of Augustus to the reign of Claudius, including the departure of Agrippa to Syria and Claudius's reconstruction of the harbour. In the 1976 television series, Ostia was frequently mentioned but never actually seen.
Ostia features in A War Within: The Gladiator by Nathan D. Maki. After an assassination attempt on Emperor Commodus the protagonists Antonius and Theudas escape by clinging to a barge on the Tiber, reaching Ostia, and stowing away on a trireme heading north to Ravenna.
Ostia appears briefly towards the end of the Roman Empire section of the 1981 comedy film History of the World, Part I, where the main characters board a galleon (bearing the El Al logo) bound for Judaea. In the film, however, Ostia is only ever referred to as simply "the port".
Ostia's beach and port serves as the location for the 1993 music video of the song "La solitudine" by Laura Pausini.
Ostia is mentioned several times in the 2005 HBO/BBC historical drama series Rome.
Ostia is mentioned in the 2000 film Gladiator, when the protagonist, Maximus, learns that his army is camped at Ostia and awaiting orders.
One of the wonders buildable in the "Rise and Fall of the Roman Empire" mod for Sid Meier's Civilization III is called the "Portus Ostiae".
Ostia is the name of the Magic World's lost kingdom and the location of the gladiatorial games in the manga series Negima! Magister Negi Magi.
Ostia is the name of the most important city of the Lycian Alliance in the Fire Emblem series.
Ostia is mentioned in several novels in Lindsey Davis' Marcus Didius Falco series.
Ostia is featured in the film Rome Adventure from 1962.
Ostia is a central location in the children's novel series The Roman Mysteries by Caroline Lawrence, and its television adaption.

Gallery

See also
 Temple of Bellona, Ostia
 Via Ostiensis
 Museo Archeologico Ostiense

Notes

References
Boatwright, Mary Taliaferro. The Romans: From Village to Empire. 2nd ed. New York: Oxford UP (2012): 248
Hermansen, Gustav 1982. Ostia: Aspects of Roman City Life (Edmonton: University of Alberta Press)
Meiggs, R. (1960) 1973. Roman Ostia 2nd ed. (Oxford University Press) The standard overview.
Packer, James E. 1971 The Insulae of Imperial Ostia" M.Am.Acad. Rome 31
Pavolini, C. '''Ostia: Guida Archeologica Laterza (Rome:Laterza) (Italian)
Priester, S. Vielgeschossige Wohnbauten außerhalb der Tibermetropole, in: Ad summas tegulas. Untersuchungen zu vielgeschossigen Gebäudeblöcken mit Wohneinheiten und insulae im kaiserzeitlichen Rom, L'Erma Di Bretschneider, Roma 2002, pp. 217 ff.
Lorenzatti Sandro, Ostia. Storia Ambiente Itinerari Roma 2007 (Rome:Genius Loci)

External links

 Photographs of Ostia at DigitalMapsoftheAncientWorld retrieved August 13, 2022

Archaeological parks
Roman towns and cities in Italy
Ancient Roman buildings and structures in Rome
Archaeological sites in Lazio
Roman sites in Lazio
Ostia (Rome)
Mithraea
Former populated places in Italy
Mediterranean port cities and towns in Italy
Tourist attractions in Rome
 
Roman harbors
Roman harbors in Italy